The Grand Atatürk Run is an annual road running event of 10K run, which takes place on 27 December in Ankara, Turkey. The date coincides with the first visit of Mustafa Kemal Atatürk, founder of the Turkish Republic, to Ankara. The competition has been held every year since 1936. It is organised under the auspices of Turkish Athletic Federation.

The race distance is roughly (though it is not a certifiably measured course. The course is set in the centre of the city, starting at Dikmen Valley Park and finishing at the front of Ankara Central Station. Initially an event for men only, a women's section was introduced in 1992, and races for both genders are now held annually. It is one of the longest running road race events in Europe.

Past winners of the race include many of the country's top distance runners. In the men's race, winners include European medallist Halil Akkaş and Mediterranean Games champions Ekrem Koçak and Mehmet Terzi. Double Olympic silver medallist Elvan Abeylegesse and Binnaz Uslu (runner-up at the European Cross Country Championships) have won on the women's side. Sükrü Saban is the most successful athlete in the history of the competition, having won eight times between 1960 and 1970. The fastest times recorded for the race are 29:26 minutes for men (set by Zeki Öztürk in 1996) and 32:19 minutes for women (set by Elvan Abeylegesse in 2002).

Past winners
Key:

Most wins
Men's

Women's

References

List of winners
Tafolar, Meric & Gasparovic, Juraj (2011-10-21). Grand Ataturk Run 10 km. Association of Road Racing Statisticians. Retrieved on 2011-12-17.

Athletics competitions in Turkey
Recurring sporting events established in 1936
Sports competitions in Ankara
Things named after Mustafa Kemal Atatürk
10K runs
1936 establishments in Turkey
Winter events in Turkey